A. glandulosa may refer to:
 Aechmea glandulosa, a plant species endemic to Brazil
 Alchornea glandulosa, a tree species native to South America
 Ansonia glandulosa, a toad species endemic to Indonesia
 Archidendropsis glandulosa, a legume species found only in New Caledonia
 Arbutus glandulosa, a plant species found in Guatemala and Mexico
 Arctostaphylos glandulosa, the Eastwood's manzanita, a shrub species native to the coastal slopes of western North America from Oregon to Baja California

See also